Králova Lhota is a municipality and village in Rychnov nad Kněžnou District in the Hradec Králové Region of the Czech Republic. It has about 200 inhabitants.

Twin towns – sister cities

Králova Lhota is twinned with:
 Kráľova Lehota, Slovakia

References

Villages in Rychnov nad Kněžnou District